Poldark is the original version of the BBC television series adaptation of the novels of the same title written by Winston Graham. The adaptation was first transmitted in the UK between 1975 and 1977. The production covered all seven novels (of the eventual twelve) that Graham had written up to this time.

Outline
The romantic saga follows Ross Poldark (Robin Ellis) as he loses his fiancée, the well-bred beauty, Elizabeth (Jill Townsend), to his cousin Francis (Clive Francis). Ross ends up marrying his servant, Demelza Carne (Angharad Rees), but his passion for Elizabeth simmers on for years. Set in late 18th century Cornwall, the plot follows Ross Poldark's attempts to make his derelict copper mines a success. Life is hard, smuggling is rife and Ross Poldark finds himself taking the side of the underclass against the ruthless behaviour of his enemies, the greedy Warleggan clan including George Warleggan (Ralph Bates).

Although the emphasis is primarily on Ross and Demelza, there are many other characters with their own stories. In the first series we encounter Dr Dwight Enys (played by Richard Morant in the first series, Michael Cadman in the second series), a forward-thinking young man who prefers to serve  poor local communities rather than the rich. Enys has a brief affair with a married actress, Keren Daniel (Sheila White), which results in her murder by her husband.
By the end of the first series, Dwight has become involved with heiress Caroline Penvenen (Judy Geeson). In the second series, they marry following Ross's rescue of Dwight from a French prison.

In the second series we get to see much of Geoffrey Charles Poldark (Stefan Gates), the son of Elizabeth and Francis Poldark. Francis drowns in a subterranean lake while investigating a putative new lode of copper in a mine in which he is invested with Ross. Elizabeth eventually marries Ross's great enemy George Warleggan. Geoffrey Charles resembles his father, and at times comes into conflict with his new stepfather George Warleggan, though Warleggan shows him certain kindnesses and pays for his education. Geoffrey Charles begins a friendship with Demelza's brother Drake Carne (Kevin McNally), whom he and his governess, Elizabeth's cousin Morwenna (Jane Wymark), meet in the woods on the Warleggan estate. Geoffrey Charles plays an instrumental role in the development of Drake and Morwenna's romance.

Drake is Ross Poldark's brother-in-law and has a working-class background: therefore George considers him an unsuitable marriage partner for Morwenna. George marries Morwenna off to Reverend Osborne Whitworth (Christopher Biggins), whom she despises. Pining for Morwenna, Drake puts his energies into building his blacksmith business and helping his brother Sam (David Delve), a devout Methodist.

Morwenna and Osborne have a son, John Conan, whom Morwenna cannot bring herself to love. Eventually Morwenna tells Osborne she will kill his son if he forces his attentions on her one more time. Osborne has an affair with Morwenna's younger sister Rowella (Julie Dawn Cole). Rowella's husband Arthur Solway (Stephen Reynolds) discovers his wife's adultery and attacks Osborne, who is dragged to death by his frightened horse. Despite being traumatized by her marriage to Osborne, Morwenna eventually marries Drake.

Sam becomes enamoured of Emma Tregirls (Trudie Styler), who refuses to marry him because she knows that his Methodist congregation will never approve of her. She loves Sam, but knows that her lack of religion and her bad reputation will eventually cause conflict between him and his faith.

However, the emphasis remains with Ross and Demelza, and the series concludes with the death of Elizabeth Warleggan after the birth of her and George's daughter Ursula. Elizabeth takes a potion to bring on labour early so Warleggan will be led to think that she habitually delivers her children a few weeks prematurely; Elizabeth had delivered Valentine, born eight months after her wedding to George, after she took a supposed accidental fall on the stairs, which, it is implied only, was intentional on her part because she felt the labour coming on. Valentine is Ross's son, conceived a month before Elizabeth and George's wedding, but George is long deceived as to Valentine's parentage. Agatha Poldark (Eileen Way) and Prudie Paynter (Mary Wimbush), Ross and Demelza's housekeeper, both realize that Valentine is Ross's son, and Agatha tells George of her conclusion just before her death, which occurs under George's abuse of her in his anger over her revelation. Elizabeth dies of gangrene due to the potion. When the doctor asks her if she has taken anything to bring on the labour, she denies it because Warleggan is sitting beside her. George later reveals his knowledge of what Elizabeth has done when he says to Ross, "See what you and I have brought her to."

Broadcast and legacy
The BBC adaptation of the first four books of the Poldark novels was broadcast by the BBC during 1975 and 1976. This included eight weeks' location filming in Cornwall. The second series was broadcast in the UK in the autumn of 1977, from the next three books. The series in total ran to 29 episodes.

Poldark is one of the most successful British television adaptations of all time. The Poldark series has since been sold in over forty countries. It is particularly popular in the United States, Spain, Italy, Greece and Israel. On video, Poldark outsold every costume drama except for the 1995 adaptation of Jane Austen's novel Pride and Prejudice.

The two series were shown to American audiences in 1977–78, as part of Masterpiece Theatre on the Public Broadcasting System. In 2007, a PBS viewer poll ranked it seventh in best-loved series from the last 35 years.

A version of the eighth Poldark novel The Stranger from the Sea was made by HTV for the ITV network in 1996, but was not continued. In 2008 the BBC made a half-hour programme entitled "The Making of Poldark" as part of its series called The Cult of Sunday Night. Many of the original cast were interviewed, including Robin Ellis, Angharad Rees, Jill Townsend and Richard Morant.

The series was referenced by Reeves and Mortimer, presenting Poldark on Mopeds as a rejected comedy programme in an advert for TV Licensing.

In February 2014, the BBC announced a new adaptation of the series, also called Poldark, to be broadcast in 2015.  The series, starring Aidan Turner as Ross Poldark and Eleanor Tomlinson as Demelza, began transmission on Saturday, 7 March 2015, on the BBC's flagship channel, BBC1. Robin Ellis was cast in a small recurring role as Reverend Dr Halse.

References

External links

 

1975 British television series debuts
1977 British television series endings
1970s British drama television series
BBC television dramas
Television series set in the 18th century
Television shows based on British novels
Television shows set in Cornwall
Television series produced at Pinewood Studios
Television series by ITV Studios
English-language television shows